Potassium stearate is a metal-organic compound, a salt of potassium and stearic acid with the chemical formula . The compound is classified as a metallic soap, i.e. a metal derivative of a fatty acid.

Synthesis
Potassium stearate may be prepared by saturating a hot alcoholic solution of stearic acid with alcoholic potash.

Physical properties
The compound forms colorless crystals.

Slightly soluble in cold water, soluble in hot water, ethanol, insoluble in ether, chloroform, carbon disulfide. A component of liquid soap.

Uses
The compound is primarily used as an emulsifier in cosmetics and in food products. It is also used as a cleansing ingredient and lubricant.

Hazards
Causes skin irritation and serious eye irritation.

References

Stearates
Potassium compounds